The Buddhist Institute is the principal Buddhist institution of the government of Cambodia.

The current director is Nguon Van Chanthy. Its primary facilities are located in Phnom Penh.

History

It was founded on May 12, 1930 by King Sisowath Monivong of Cambodia, King Sisavong Vong of Laos, the Governor General of Indochina Pierre Pasquier and head of the École française d'Extrême-Orient, George Coedes.

Organization
Administrative Department
Tripitaka Commission
Mores and Customs Commission
Library
Bookstore

See also
 Pāli Canon (Vinaya Pitaka, Sutta Pitaka & Abhidhamma Pitaka)
 Early Buddhist Texts
 Pali literature & Palm-leaf manuscript
 List of Pali Canon anthologies
 Theravada Buddhism
 International Theravada Buddhist Missionary University
 State Pariyatti Sasana University, Yangon
 State Pariyatti Sasana University, Mandalay
 Dhammaduta Chekinda University
 Buddhist and Pali University of Sri Lanka
 Lumbini Buddhist University
 Mahachulalongkornrajavidyalaya University
 Mahamakut Buddhist University
 Monastic schools in Myanmar
 International Buddhist Studies College
 Sitagu International Buddhist Academy
 Chittagong Pali College (Bangladesh)
 Oxford Centre for Buddhist Studies (UK)
 Sanam Luang Dhamma Studies (Thailand)
 Buddhism in Cambodia

References

External links
 Buddhist Institute official site

Government agencies of Cambodia
Religious organisations based in Cambodia
Buddhism in Cambodia
Buddhist organizations
Religious organizations established in 1930
1930 establishments in Cambodia
Tripiṭaka
Organisations based in Phnom Penh